John McDonnell (born 26 March 1965 in Dublin) is an Irish football manager and former footballer. He most recently managed Drogheda United having also managed Dublin City, St Patrick's Athletic, Newry City, Shelbourne and been assistant manager of Faroe Islands.

Nicknamed Johnny Mac, he had an accomplished career as a footballer before entering management. The majority of his career was spent at St Patrick's Athletic and he captained the side to the 1996 League of Ireland Championship.

Career

Playing career 
As a defender, McDonnell started his career with Shamrock Rovers in the 1983–84 season (five total appearances), followed by Home Farm, Drogheda United before signing for Pats. After winning the league there he signed back for Rovers for the 1991–92 where he scored once in 34 appearances.

He then signed back for another spell at Richmond Park where he captained the side to the League triumph in the 1995–96 season under manager Brian Kerr. Despite missing out on the Champions League due to then format in the first ever European tie at Richmond Park McDonnell scored in the UEFA Cup tie with SK Slovan Bratislava.

He then moved to Newry Town. It was with the Northern Irish club that he made the first step into management, becoming player-manager in 1998.

In this first ever season in European competition, Newry Town (as they were then known) were drawn against the Croatia side Hrvatski Dragovoljac. A 1–0 defeat in Croatia was followed by a historic 2–0 win at home to send the club into the second round. There they met Bundesliga side MSV Duisburg. Again, Newry were drawn away in the first leg, coming away with a respectable 2–0 defeat to the German professionals. A 1–0 win at home wasn't enough to force extra time but the side had exceeded expectations in the tournament.

He resigned in September 1999.

Management career 
Having previously been player-manager for Newry Town, the chance came to manage at newly founded League of Ireland side Dublin City then he was appointed as assistant manager at then league champions Shelbourne. McDonnell was assistant manager of the Republic of Ireland national team Under 20s at the 2003 FIFA World Youth Championships.

In 2004, when Eamonn Collins resigned as St Pats manager, the club turned to its former captain and firm fans' favourite, McDonnell, to turn around the fortunes of the ailing Dublin giant. (Ironically Collins would take McDonnell's job as Pat Fenlon's assistant.) His side initially struggled and only a late burst at the end of the 2005 season saw St. Pats saved from a humiliating relegation. For the 2006 season, he assembled practically a whole new squad and reached the final of the FAI Cup losing to Derry City 4–3. He then guided Pats to their best ever European run in the UEFA Cup in the 2008/2009 season where they qualified for the first round proper after eliminating JFK Olimps Riga and IF Elfsborg.

He is the first St Pats player to win the League of Ireland, score and manage the club in European competition.

In January 2009, he departed as St Patrick's Athletic manager. He was then linked with the Assistant Manager position at Leeds United, the Manager position at Cork City and manager positions at League 2 sides Barnet and AFC Bournemouth.

In September 2009, he returned to Irish League side Newry City as manager following the resignation of Gerry Flynn. In March 2010, he resigned. In April 2010, he was appointed Assistant Manager of the Faroe Islands, by manager Brian Kerr, his former colleague at St Pat's. Kerr and McDonnell resigned in October 2011.

On 24 May 2013, McDonnell was appointed manager of Shelbourne.

McDonnell was appointed Drogheda United boss on 29 November 2014.

Honours
St Patrick's Athletic
 League of Ireland: 1989–90, 1995–96
 SRFC Young Player of the Year: 1983–84

References

1965 births
Living people
Association footballers from County Dublin
Republic of Ireland association footballers
Association football defenders
Home Farm F.C. players
Drogheda United F.C. players
Shamrock Rovers F.C. players
St Patrick's Athletic F.C. players
League of Ireland players
St Patrick's Athletic F.C. managers
Republic of Ireland football managers
League of Ireland managers
Newry City F.C. players
NIFL Premiership players
League of Ireland XI players
Belvedere F.C. players